McKenna Dahl (born May 1, 1996) is an American Paralympic sports shooter. She became the first female sports shooter to win a medal in shooting at the 2016 Summer Paralympics and also won two medals in the 2019 Parapan American Games.

Dahl studied business and technology management in DeVry University in 2018.

References

1996 births
Living people
American female sport shooters
Paralympic shooters of the United States
Paralympic bronze medalists for the United States
Paralympic medalists in shooting
Shooters at the 2016 Summer Paralympics
Medalists at the 2016 Summer Paralympics
Sportspeople from Colorado Springs, Colorado
Medalists at the 2019 Parapan American Games
Shooters at the 2020 Summer Paralympics
DeVry University alumni
Sportspeople from Seattle